The little whip snake (Suta flagellum), also known commonly as the whip hooded snake, is a species of venomous snake in the family Elapidae. The species is endemic to Australia.

Description
Its most notable feature is the black patch, shaped like an hourglass, which extends from the back of its nape to between the eyes. The body of the snake is orange to tan dorsally, and cream-colored ventrally.

Behavior
S. flagellum is generally nocturnal and found under rocks and logs.

Diet
The whip hooded snake preys upon lizards and frogs.

Habitat
In New South Wales, the preferred natural habitats of S. flagellum are temperate grasslands and grassy woodlands.

Venom
The little whip snake is venomous, though virtually harmless to humans.

Reproduction
S. flagellum is viviparous. Brood size is seven or fewer.

References

Further reading
Boulenger GA (1896). Catalogue of the Snakes in the British Museum (Natural History). Volume III. Containing the Colubridæ (Opisthoglyphæ and Proteroglyphæ) ... London: Trustees of the British Museum (Natural History). (Taylor and Francis, printers). xiv + 727 pp. + Plates I-XXV. (Denisonia flagellum, p. 340).
Cogger HG (2014). Reptiles and Amphibians of Australia, Seventh Edition. Clayton, Victoria, Australia: CSIRO Publishing. xxx + 1,033 pp. .
Coventry AJ (1971). "Identification of the Black-headed Snakes (Denisonia) within Victoria". The Victorian Naturalist 88: 304–306. (Denisonia flagellum, p. 305, Figure 1A).
McCoy F (1878). Natural History of Victoria. Prodromus of the Zoology of Victoria; or, Figures and Descriptions of the Living Species of All Classes of the Victorian Indigenous Animals. Volume I. (Decades I. to X.) Melbourne: John Ferres, Government Printer / London: Trübner and Co. 223 pp. + Plates 1-49. (Hoplocephalus flagellum, new species, Decade II, pp. 7–8 + Plate 11, figures 1, 1a, 1b, 1d, 1d).
Turner, Grant (1998). "Evidence of diurnal mate-searching in male little whip snakes, Suta flagellum (Elapidae)". Herpetofauna, Sydney 28 (1): 46–50.
Wilson, Steve; Swan, Gerry (2013). A Complete Guide to Reptiles of Australia, Fourth Edition. Sydney: New Holland Publishers. 522 pp. .

Snakes of Australia
Suta
Reptiles described in 1878
Taxobox binomials not recognized by IUCN